Anthurus is a genus of fungi in the family Phallaceae.

Species 
, Species Fungorum accepted 4 species of Anthurus:

 Anthurus brownii
 Anthurus macowanii
 Anthurus muellerianus
 Anthurus surinamensis

References

External links
Index Fungorum

Phallales
Agaricomycetes genera